Stiefel may refer to:

 Eduard Stiefel (1909–1978), Swiss mathematician
 Ethan Stiefel (born 1973), American ballet dancer
 Stiefel Laboratories, GSK company

See also
 

Surnames from given names
Occupational surnames